The 2023 CFL Global Draft is a selection of non-Canadian and non-American players by Canadian Football League (CFL) teams that is scheduled to take place on May 2, 2023, at 11:00 am ET. It will be the third CFL Draft that pools all of the global players together after previously having separate drafts for Mexican players and European players in 2019. If the same format is used as for 2022, 27 players will be chosen from among eligible players following a CFL Combine.

Trades
In the explanations below, (D) denotes trades that took place during the draft, while (PD) indicates trades completed pre-draft.

Round three
 Calgary → Saskatchewan (PD). Calgary traded this selection and a seventh-round selection in the 2023 CFL National Draft to Saskatchewan in exchange for James Smith.
 Saskatchewan → Calgary (PD). Saskatchewan traded this selection originally acquired from Calgary back to Calgary in exchange for James Smith.

References
Trade references

General references

Canadian College Draft
2023 in Canadian football
CFL Global